Viktor Vladimirovich Wagner, also Vagner (4 November 1908 – 15 August 1981) was a Russian mathematician, best known for his work in differential geometry and on semigroups.

Wagner was born in Saratov and studied at Moscow State University, where Veniamin Kagan was his advisor.  He became the first geometry chair at Saratov State University.  He received the Lobachevsky Medal in 1937.

Wagner was also awarded "the Order of Lenin, the Order of the Red Banner, and the title of Honoured Scientist RSFSR. Moreover, he was also accorded that rarest of privileges in the USSR: permission to travel abroad."

Wagner is credited with noting that the collection of partial transformations on a set X forms a semigroup  which is a subsemigroup of the semigroup  of binary relations on the same set X, where the semigroup operation is composition of relations. "This simple unifying observation, which is nevertheless an important psychological hurdle, is attributed by Schein (1986) to V.V. Wagner."

See also
 Inverse semigroup
 Heap

References

External links 
 
 
 Wagner's Biography – in Russian

Soviet mathematicians
Moscow State University alumni
Differential geometers
Algebraists
20th-century Russian mathematicians
1908 births
1981 deaths